Grant Tanner (born 24 July 1970) is a former Australian rules footballer who played with Geelong in the AFL during the mid-1990s.

Before Tanner came to Geelong he was on Adelaide's books but never made a senior appearance. In between he played in the SANFL with Norwood. He was part of Geelong's 1994 finals campaign but missed the Grand Final due to injury. The following year he was again injured late in the season but recovered in time for the 1995 AFL Grand Final, which his team lost heavily to Carlton. 

A knee injury sustained in 1997 ended his career.

References

Holmesby, Russell and Main, Jim (2007). The Encyclopedia of AFL Footballers. 7th ed. Melbourne: Bas Publishing.

1970 births
Living people
Australian rules footballers from South Australia
Geelong Football Club players
Norwood Football Club players